En Thangachi Padichava is a 1988 Indian Tamil-language drama film directed by P. Vasu. The film stars Prabhu, Rupini and Chithra. It was released on 15 July 1988. The film completed a 100-day run at the box-office. It was remade in Telugu as Muddula Mavayya (1989), in Hindi as Aaj Ka Arjun (1990), and in Kannada as Ravimama (1999).

Plot 

Dhanakodi, an honest police officer, is transferred to a small village. In this village, Karunakaran, a rich landlord, spreads terror among the villagers and threatens them to obtain their lands. After spending five years in jail for a murder, Periasamy is back to his village. Dhanakodi wants to trap the heartless Karunakaran at any cost.

In the past, Periasamy was an orphan who lived with his only sister Lakshmi. Lakshmi, after finishing her studies in the city, came back to her village. Periasamy and Valli were in love. She is still against Karunakaran's conspiracy. Lakshmi and Karunakaran's son Chinnaiah fell in love with each other and got married with Periasamy's support. Chinnaiah went missing, while Lakshmi became pregnant. Lakshmi found out that Chinnaiah was in his father's house and it was Karunakaran's master plan. Periasamy went there, but he was humiliated by Karunakaran. In the meantime, Chinnaiah stabbed Lakshmi, and Lakshmi gave birth before dying. Enraged, Periasamy killed Chinnaiah. What transpires later forms the crux of the story.

Cast 

Prabhu as Periasamy
Rupini as Valli / Gauri
Chithra as Lakshmi
Nassar as Dhanakodi
Kitty as Karunakaran
Mohan Natarajan as Manikkam
Ravikiran as Chinnaiah
Vignesh as fighter
Anandaraj as Gaja
Sudha
Mayilsamy as Constable
Marthandan
Kullamani
Karuppu Subbiah
Pasi Narayanan
Sivaraman
Nethran

Production 
The film's shooting was held in Pollachi. It was P. Vasu's first solo direction in Tamil.

Soundtrack 
The soundtrack was composed by Gangai Amaran, who also wrote the lyrics. It is his 100th film as composer.

Release and reception 
En Thangachi Padichava was released on 15 July 1988, and became a success, running for over 100 days in theatres. NKS of The Indian Express wrote, "It's a difficult thing to comment on a patchwork quilt of this sort, which is what commercial films are."

Remakes 
En Thangachi Padichava was remade in Telugu as Muddula Mavayya (1989), in Hindi as Aaj Ka Arjun (1990), and in Kannada as Ravimama (1999).

References

External links 
 

1988 drama films
1980s Tamil-language films
1988 films
Films directed by P. Vasu
Films scored by Gangai Amaran
Indian drama films
Tamil films remade in other languages